Bloemendal is located North of Port Elizabeth, in the Eastern Cape, South Africa. It is also known as the Northern Area.

Under Apartheid, the South African government separated each race and forced them into different townships under the Group Areas Act. Coloureds were moved to "'Bloemendal"' in the 1970s.

Geography of the Eastern Cape